Cannabis in Greenland is illegal, but is used in the country. Scholarly works in 2010 and 2015 noted increasing cannabis use in the nation.

References 

 
Greenland
Politics of Greenland
Drugs in Greenland
Greenland